Mount Carroll is a horseshoe-shaped mountain rising to , south of Hope Bay on the Trinity Peninsula. It was discovered and mapped by the Swedish Antarctic Expedition under Otto Nordenskiöld (1901–04) and surveyed by the Falklands Islands Dependencies Survey (1945–47), and named in error Mount Carrel after Tom Carroll (b. 1864), Newfoundland boatswain of the ship Eagle, which participated in establishing the Falklands Islands Dependencies Survey (FIDS) Hope Bay base in February 1945. The spelling has been amended to correct the original error.

This peak is very similar to and has been frequently misidentified in bad weather as The Pyramid, a peak 0.8 nautical miles (1.5 km) to the east. The name is simply the word "pyramid" reversed.

References

Mountains of Trinity Peninsula